A list of Welsh scientists.

 David Brunt, meteorologist
 Kathleen E. Carpenter, freshwater ecologist
 Alan Cox, computer scientist
 Edgeworth David, geologist and Antarctic explorer
 Donald Davies, computer scientist and co-inventor of packet switching
 Dianne Edwards, palaeobotanist
 William Frost, pioneer designer of aeroplanes
 David Edward Hughes, radio and audio pioneer
 Mary Gillham, naturalist
 John L. Harper, botanist
 Steve Jones, geneticist
 William Jones, mathematician 
 Brian Josephson, theoretical physicist
 John Maddox, scientist and science journalist
 Lily Newton, botanist and vice-principal at the University of Wales
 Emyr Jones Parry, scientist and diplomat
 Robert Recorde, physician and mathematician 
 Emlyn Rhoderick, solid state physicist
 Bertrand Russell, philosopher, logician, mathematician, historian, and social critic
 John Meurig Thomas, solid state chemist
 Alfred Russel Wallace, naturalist, explorer, geographer, anthropologist, and evolutionary biologist

See also 
 :Category:Welsh scientists
 List of scientists

Welsh
Science and technology in the United Kingdom